Jethro Tull are an English progressive rock band from Blackpool. Formed in December 1967, the group originally included vocalist and flautist Ian Anderson, guitarist and backing vocalist Mick Abrahams, bassist Glenn Cornick and drummer Clive Bunker. Other long-running members include guitarist Martin Barre, who played on all but the first and most recent studio albums, drummer Doane Perry, who was with the group for 28 years, and bassist Dave Pegg, who was with the group almost 16 years.

The group's current lineup includes Anderson, bassist David Goodier, keyboardist John O'Hara, drummer Scott Hammond and guitarist Joe Parrish.

History

1967–1981
Jethro Tull are an English progressive rock band from Blackpool. Formed in December 1967, the group originally included vocalist and flautist Ian Anderson, guitarist and backing vocalist Mick Abrahams, bassist Glenn Cornick and drummer Clive Bunker. After contributing to the band's debut album This Was, Abrahams left Jethro Tull in December 1968, citing disagreements with the band's "basic policies, both musically and otherwise". He was replaced before the end of the year by Martin Barre, after rehearsals and stand-in performances by David O'List and Tony Iommi. Keyboardist John Evan was added to the band's lineup in April 1970, after contributing to Benefit as a guest performer. By the end of the year, Cornick had left the band due to "musical differences", with Jeffrey Hammond-Hammond taking his place. Anderson was left as the sole original member of the group by May 1971, when Bunker also left due to their heavy touring schedule. He was replaced by Barriemore Barlow.

After contributing to five albums with Jethro Tull, Hammond-Hammond retired from music in December 1975, with John Glascock taking his place. Dee Palmer (then known as David) was added to the group as a second keyboardist in 1977, having contributed orchestral arrangements to every studio album to date. During the recording of Stormwatch in 1979, Glascock was dismissed from the band due to increasing health problems, with Anderson recording the majority of the album's bass parts. Dave Pegg replaced Glascock for the album's promotional tour, before the former bassist died of complications from heart surgery on 17 November 1979. Following the conclusion of the tour, Barlow, Evan and Palmer departed, with new drummer Mark Craney and "special guest" keyboardist Eddie Jobson joining in early 1980.

1981 onwards
Craney and Jobson both left after the A tour in 1981, with their places taken by Gerry Conway and Peter-John Vettese, respectively. Conway left after performing on 1982's The Broadsword and the Beast and the European leg of the album's tour, with Paul Burgess brought in to complete US dates later in the year. In 1984, Doane Perry joined as Conway's permanent replacement after the recording of Under Wraps. The group was placed on temporary hiatus during the mid-1980s as Anderson dealt with throat problems, before returning in 1987 (without Vettese) on Crest of a Knave. Maartin Allcock took over as the band's keyboardist in 1988, remaining until 1991 when Andrew Giddings took his place. Pegg left in 1995 to focus on Fairport Convention, with Jonathan Noyce brought in later as his replacement.

The lineup of Jethro Tull remained stable until 2007, when Noyce and Giddings left the group and were replaced by Anderson's solo bandmates David Goodier and John O'Hara, respectively. Anderson began focusing on releasing and touring under his own name in 2011, when Jethro Tull was essentially disbanded. In August 2017, it was announced that Jethro Tull would return for a tour the following year to mark the 50th anniversary of their debut album This Was, with Anderson solo band members Florian Opahle (guitar) and Scott Hammond (drums) joining the frontman alongside Goodier and O'Hara. In late 2019, Opahle left the band to concentrate on production work and family. He was replaced by Joe Parrish.

Members

Current

Former

Touring

Timeline

Lineups

Bibliography

References

External links
Jethro Tull official website

Jethro Tull